Wang Can (born 10 February 1994) is a Chinese professional pool player. Wang has represented China at the World Cup of Pool with playing partner Dang Jinhu. He reached the quarter-finals at the 2014 event, losing to the pair of Albin Ouschan and Mario He.

Titles
 2014 WPA World Team Championship

References

External links 

1994 births
Chinese pool players
Living people